= Tyanollos =

Town in ancient Lydia

Coordinates: 38°44′36″N 27°43′34″E

Tyanollos was a town of ancient Lydia, inhabited during Hellenistic and Roman times.

Its site is located near Lütfiye in Asiatic Turkey.
